Shalkar-Yega-Kara is a lake in Orenburg Oblast, Russian Federation. 

The lake is located in the Svetlinsky District, close to the Kazakhstan–Russia border. Svetly village lies close to the northern shore of the lake.

Geography
Shalkar-Yega-Kara is the largest lake in Orenburg Oblast. It is an almost round, shallow lake located at the bottom of a bowl-shaped depression in the steppe. Its shores are very gently sloping. Smaller lake Kayrankol lies to the north of its northeastern end. The only river feeding its waters is the Buruktal during the spring season, but in most years it doesn't reach the lake and the Shalkar-Yega-Kara dries completely up. 

The Kazakhstan–Russia border runs barely  to the south of the southern shore.

Fauna
The main fish species in the Shalkar-Yega-Kara is the crucian carp. In the years where the Buruktal flows and fills the lake, perch, carp, ide and roach are also found. Certain spots of the lakeshore provide a breeding ground for terns, Dalmatian pelicans and Great cormorants.

See also
List of lakes of Russia

References

External links

Озеро Шалкар-Ега-Кара. Описание места - RuTraveller
Description of the lake Shalkar Ega Kara. Sillenian lakes

Lakes of Orenburg Oblast
Endorheic lakes of Asia